The history of Arizona State University began March 12, 1885 with the founding of the establishment originally named the Territorial Normal School at Tempe. The school was founded after John Samuel Armstrong first introduced House Bill 164, “An Act to Establish a Normal School in the Territory of Arizona” to the 13th Legislative Assembly of the Arizona Territory. Instruction was instituted on February 8, 1886, under the supervision of Principal Hiram Bradford Farmer. Land for the school was donated by Tempe residents George and Martha Wilson, allowing 33 students to meet in a single room.

Founding

Arizona State University was founded in 1885 as the Territorial Normal School at Tempe by an act of the Thirteenth Legislative Assembly of the Territory of Arizona. But without the skillful political maneuvers of the young legislator John S. Armstrong and the support of town founder Charles T. Hayden the institution might not have been located at Tempe.

The advocacy of territorial Governor Anton P. K. Safford helped Arizonans recognize the need for an institution to train teachers to work in the public schools, but it was not until the Thirteenth Legislative Assembly was seated in 1885 that the political will to address secondary and higher education was manifest. The Assembly would consider in this session big-ticket appropriations for a mental health facility, a university and a normal school. Citizens of Tucson also hoped the Thirteenth would restore the territorial capitol to their city since it was moved back to Prescott in 1878. As a result, a number of political prizes were available for barter during this legislative session, and because of the substantial $100,000 appropriation attached to the mental health facility, it was this institution that many sought as their first priority.

At twenty-eight years old John Armstrong was the second youngest representative in the Thirteenth Legislative Assembly, a Democrat in his first term who was elected on a platform of securing both the mental health facility and the university for predominantly Republican Maricopa County. Upon his election he immediately applied for appointment to the House Education Committee. In a surprise move he was appointed chair of that committee by Speaker R. G. Rollins of Tucson, but his appointment was balanced by the assignment of the formidable C. C. Stephens of Tucson as chair of the council (Senate) Committee on Education. Any bill to establish a normal school or a university would have to be approved by both the House and Council and signed by the Governor.

There are conflicting accounts of when John Armstrong decided to pursue the normal school for Tempe. The appointment of Stephens as chair of the Council education committee and of E. W. Risley of Tucson to the related House committee suggested that the Tucson interests could not secure the votes to return the capitol to their city. They were positioning themselves to bargain for the university. Armstrong apparently recognized the opportunity and built a coalition to bring the normal school to Tempe in exchange for supporting a public school reform bill and for locating the mental health facility in Phoenix.

On February 26, 1885, Armstrong introduced House Bill no. 164, “An Act to Establish a Normal School in the Territory of Arizona.” The bill would establish a territorial normal school at Tempe to train public school teachers and also teach "husbandry" (agriculture) and the mechanical arts. $5,000 was proposed for founding the institution and $3,500 was set aside for two years of operating expenses, after which the institution would be supported by tax revenue. The founding appropriations would be provided if the citizens of Tempe donated land for the school within 60 days of the bill's passage.

HB 164 passed the House Education Committee on March 3, and on March 5 Mr. Stephens introduced Council Bill no. 76, "An Act to Organize the University of the Territory of Arizona and to locate it at Tucson." This bill was read and referred to the Council Committee on Education. Back in the House on March 6, Armstrong called for suspension of the rules and a vote on HB 164. The members agreed and passed the bill later that day. Stephens spent the weekend assessing the prospects for his university bill and realized he needed Armstrong's support for House approval. On Tuesday, March 10, Stephens moved that HB 164 and CB 76 be considered by committee of the whole, bypassing his own Council Education Committee and ensuring that the bills would be considered together.

On the morning of March 11, Council passed HB 164, sending the bill to the governor for signature and ensuring the establishment of the normal school at Tempe. During the afternoon session the House passed CB 76, establishing the university at Tucson. Governor F.A. Tritle signed both bills on March 12, 1885.

All that remained was securing  for the school from the citizens of Tempe. One account states that Charles Trumbull Hayden arranged for a town meeting in January in which the citizens of Tempe agreed that a normal school was desirable, and that George and Martha Wilson's cow pasture was the best location. The Wilsons originally agreed to donate  in exchange for $500 raised by the citizens of Tempe at that meeting. Now they would have to donate their entire pasture, which was needed to support their business, the Pioneer Meat Market, to meet the  requirement. On May 5 the Wilsons donated the entire  in exchange for $500, creating the core of the original campus and ensuring the establishment of Arizona State University.

Early years

Principal Hiram Bradford Farmer opened the Territorial Normal School's four classroom building to 33 students on February 8, 1886, the first institution of higher education to open in Arizona. The Normal School was charged to provide "instruction of persons, both male and female, in the art of teaching, and in all the various branches that pertain to a good common school education; also, to give instruction in the mechanical arts and in husbandry and agricultural chemistry, in the fundamental law of the United States, and in what regards the rights and duties of citizens."

Admission requirements were a minimum age of 16 years and successful completion of an entrance examination. Advanced placement by examination was accepted with 22 weeks of attendance. Principal Farmer taught all subjects. “Sub-normal” classes were offered to students lacking a high school diploma until 1923. Upon completion of the requirements a diploma and teaching certificate were awarded.

In 1899, the requirement for a diploma increased to a three-year course with a test of proficiency in academic and professional (teacher instruction) studies. By 1900 there were six faculty members and 131 students.			

As a result of the opening of the Normal School at Flagstaff, in 1901 the legislature instituted the official and legal name Tempe Normal School that was presented in all official publications starting in 1903. The Department of Manual Arts (1906) and classes in Agriculture (1912) were introduced into the curriculum in accordance with requirements of the founding legislation. On March 20, 1911, President Theodore Roosevelt visited Tempe Normal School and spoke to the community from the steps of Old Main, two days after he dedicated Roosevelt Dam. In his thirteen-minute speech he presented his vision for education of children, educational training and the development of the Valley.

In the 1920s the Alumni Association led political efforts to rename the Normal School and advance to a more robust teachers college curriculum. In 1923 admission requirements were raised to a high school diploma. The Tempe State Teachers College established in 1925 boasted 41 faculty members and 672 students, and by 1929 the Arizona State Teacher's College offered a four year-college curriculum leading to the Bachelor of Education. A two-year curriculum was also available to secure a certificate of eligibility to teach in Arizona elementary schools.

Students completing the four-year course were eligible for graduate work in education at a university, and they would receive secondary certificates permitting them to teach in Arizona high schools. The requirement for a diploma and a grade school teaching certificates increased to a three-year curriculum.

Gammage years

In the early 1930s, Arizona State needed national accreditation to be recognized as an educational institution of quality, but eligibility requirements of accrediting organizations specified that a large percentage of faculty must hold advanced degrees, particularly doctorates. As a result, under the leadership of President Ralph Swetman many faculty contracts were terminated and new faculty hired. In 1933 Grady Gammage became President of the Arizona State Teacher's College, and later that year the North Central Association (NCA) granted Arizona State Teacher's College at Tempe its first permanent and unconditional accreditation. In 1937 Arizona State offered its first graduate degree, the Masters in Education. Although courses were offered in other academic and professional disciplines, the school remained a teachers college until 1945.

Arizona State College at Tempe dropped the teacher's college appellation in 1945, and it was now governed by the newly established Arizona Board of Regents. The college offered a more diverse curriculum, but the only advanced degree available there was still the Master of Arts in education. Military personnel who trained for their World War II service in the valley remembered the abundant sunshine and relaxed civilian lifestyle they witnessed before deployment. They returned to settle in the Valley of the Sun and advance their education with GI Bill dollars. As a result, ASC enrollment tripled between 1940 and 1949 to 4,094 students, and Valley manufacturing and industry exploded in this period as well.

In 1953 the Arizona Board of Regents (dominated by University of Arizona alumni), authorized the establishment of a College of Arts and Sciences and called for the United States Department of Education to evaluate the ASC program. Dr. Ernest V. Hollis’ 1954 report declared that ASC was "rapidly becoming a university" and proposed the establishment of four colleges: Liberal Arts, Education, Applied Arts and Sciences, and Business and Public Administration. The Hollis Report precipitated howls of displeasure from southern Arizona that echoed through the Board of Regents and the Arizona Legislature, but in the November 1954 Regents meeting Governor John Howard Pyle cast the deciding vote to accept the recommendations, which were implemented the following year.

Meanwhile, a war of words erupted in legislative chambers, major city newspapers and alumni magazines over Hollis’ declaration that a second Arizona university was emerging in the desert. Arizona State College student leaders collected petition signatures, legislation was crafted and buried in committees, and Eugene Pulliam's Arizona Republic justified references to Arizona State University as a matter of accuracy in journalism. But the powerful State Senator Harold Giss of Yuma unwittingly poured gas on the fire when in March 1958 he introduced legislation to name the institution Tempe University. Hundreds of angry students laid siege at the state capitol in Phoenix until Giss appeared at the balcony and promised to withdraw the bill. An embarrassed President Grady Gammage admonished the student behavior, and quietly appointed Alumni Association Executive Director James Creasman to coordinate the statewide initiative drive that would give Arizonans their second public university.

Five hundred and ninety-nine students formed a committee to collect petition signatures in the spring of 1958, assisted by the Alumni Association and the "Citizens for Arizona State University" led by Walter Craig and John B. Mills. They needed 28,859 valid signatures, but by July 1 they had collected 63,956 signatures and they delivered them to the capitol by armored car. Meanwhile, the "Citizens for College and University Education" returned fire with editorials, radio ads and pamphlets declaring that the "name change" movement was wasteful duplication and poor educational policy. Mrs. Kathryn Gammage, first year football coach Frank Kush and college administrators and faculty toured the state to promote Arizona State University, while C.W. Laing and Tom Lillico barnstormed the state in their Yes 200 Piper aircraft. Opening day at the new Sun Devil Stadium featured the letters AS painted in the end zone, with room for the U to be added, while the opposition burned "No 200" into the turf at midfield.

Election day dawned on November 4, 1958, and an army of 1,500 student volunteers was deployed to assist with voter information and transportation to the polls. A communications center was established in the Memorial Union, and the students gathered outside as the polls closed at 7:00. The teleprinter chattered election results in favor of ASU two to one, and at 10:00 the Citizens for College and University Education conceded the election. Celebrations began, but thirty minutes later a wire service reported returns two to one against ASU and the tension was renewed. At 11:00 the teleprinter declared the previous reports inaccurate and Proposition 200 approved by a two to one margin. The celebration was renewed with the Sun Devil Marching Band, cheerleaders and pom-pom girls leading 5,000 jubilant students to Sun Devil Stadium. All that remained was the gubernatorial proclamation enacting the initiative results, and so on December 5, 1958, the governor signed the executive order that created Arizona State University.

ASU established itself as a university in name, and it had the public support and regent authorization to offer advanced degrees, but the talented faculty, graduate students and laboratory facilities needed to establish university research programs in the sciences were generally not available at ASU in 1958. University administrators and faculty realized that fulfilling the promise of a university required much more than a name change, and as early as 1955 they worked overtime to create a research university from scratch.

Building a research university

National Science Foundation grant applications from Arizona State College in the 1950s and early 1960s often focused on teacher training programs or “Summer Institutes” in various science disciplines. However, there were several faculty who served as the university pioneers in attracting federal grants for scientific research, mainly in the fields of biology, water management, meteoritics and solid state science.

In the mid-1940s Dr. Herbert Stahnke received research support from the Arizona State Legislature through two appropriations bills for research projects relating to scorpions, snakes and other venomous animals. This work led to establishment of the Poisonous Animals Research Laboratory in 1945, which produced anti-venom for venomous species native to the southwest region. Stahnke's zeal was honored by the college in this period since he was one of a handful of faculty writing research grants at that time, and he eventually received support from the National Science Foundation and the National Institutes of Health. His provocative research led to a number of television appearances and a lecture tour of Europe in 1961. In the early 1970s Stahnke's laboratory was threatened with elimination when university administrators questioned the quality of his anti-venom and the role of public universities in providing this service, but the lab remained in operation until 1988.

H. H. Nininger was a lay scientist and collector of meteorites who became an internationally recognized expert on the subject. In the late-1950s he expressed interest in an association with ASU to support his research. While an early NSF proposal for Nininger's meteoritics field research failed, he established a relationship with George Boyd (the university's first Director of Research) that ultimately resulted in a grant of $240,000 from the National Science Foundation for the purchase of the Nininger Meteorite Collection, the largest meteorite collection hosted by a university and considered among the top five in the world. Given Nininger's world-class stature as an expert in meteoritics, and a general re-examination of science education in America in response to the Soviet launch of the Sputnik satellite, ASU's acquisition of this collection in 1960 caught the attention of NSF and NASA.

Soon afterward Dr. Carleton Moore was appointed to serve as the first director of ASU's Center for Meteorite Studies, which exists to this day. Dr. Moore acquired thirty-five research grants in materials science and geology from NASA, NSF and USGS from 1963 to 1987. Moore was selected to evaluate moon dust and moon rocks acquired from NASA's Apollo missions in the 1970s, and his research was particularly well-publicized. This work resulted in a large number of public speaking opportunities in Arizona, and set the stage for externally funded research in planetary geology and astrophysics by subsequent ASU faculty.

University scientific research also required laboratories, and founding dean Lee P. Thompson of the College of Engineering established collaborations with several industrial firms like General Electric, Motorola and AiResearch that enabled the purchase of expensive and specialized equipment. Early labs were built to support research in fluid mechanics, heat transfer, and turbine engine development. The results of this research facilitated development of marketable technologies by Arizona businesses.

In 1960 the arrival of ASU President G. Homer Durham from the University of Utah marked the beginning of attempts to actively recruit research science faculty. Appointments of well-credentialed faculty such as Carleton Moore, Charles M. Woolf, Troy Péwé and LeRoy Eyring confirmed ASU's ability to attract top notch researchers. These faculty members recognized the potential of ASU and were willing to build the infrastructure that eventually attracted many talented research faculty and resulted in the award of hundreds of science PhD's.

Meanwhile, President Durham also led efforts to expand ASU's curriculum by establishing several new colleges (the College of Fine Arts, the College of Law, the College of Nursing, and the School of Social Work) and through reorganizing what became the College of Liberal Arts and Sciences and the College of Engineering and Applied Sciences.

Expanding capacity

The next three presidents—Harry K. Newburn (1969–71), John W. Schwada, (1971–81), J. Russell Nelson (1981–89) and Interim President Richard Peck (1989)—led the university to greater academic stature in the face of increasing demand for educational services. But early in this period ASU experienced the growth pains of a maturing university when the Arizona Board of Regents dismissed the irascible Morris Starsky, a tenured professor of philosophy, for cancelling class to participate in an anti-racism protest in Tucson and other improprieties. Even though two ASU faculty committees and President Newburn acquitted Starsky, the university was later censured by the American Association of University Professors for violating Starsky's academic freedom.
 
In 1984 ASU responded to explosive growth in the Phoenix metropolitan area by establishing the ASU West Campus. ASU West was originally intended to serve as an upper division university that drew its student body from the Maricopa County community college system, one of the largest in the country.  As demand increased the institution expanded into a four-year program and it sought separate accreditation.

Under the leadership of Dr. Lattie F. Coor, from 1990 to 2002, ASU grew to serve the Valley of the Sun through multiple campuses and extended education sites. He established the ASU East campus (now known as the Polytechnic campus) at the former Williams Air Force Base, and he founded the ASU Downtown Center as the host for the College of Extended Education. His commitment to “four pillars” of diversity, quality in undergraduate education, research, and economic development underscored the university's significant gains in each of these areas over his 12-year tenure. In 1994 ASU science researchers were honored by the Carnegie Center for Advancement of Teaching when they awarded Research 1 status to the university. The recognition was considered a remarkable feat for a university that is ineligible for the substantial research dollars associated with medical schools and land grant agriculture programs.  Another part of Dr. Coor's legacy was the most successful capital campaign in university history to date, raising more than $300 million primarily through private donations from the local community. Among the campaign's achievements were the naming and endowing of the Barrett Honors College, the Katherine K. Herberger College of Fine Arts, and the Morrison School of Management and Agribusiness at ASU East.

Recent developments

During the 2019 college admissions bribery scandal, ASU's reputation received negative press coverage when it was alleged in court filings that one of the defendant parents had named ASU as a university they were specifically trying to avoid.  It was reported in connection with such coverage that the non-selective university has been the "butt of jokes" in American television shows for many years, as well as the 2015 film Ted 2.

References

External links
 Evolution of a University, a series on ASU's history and future plans printed in The State Press from Nov. 4–6, 2008
 50 years ago, voters endorse name change for Arizona State
 Longtime employees look back at past 50 years’ ASU presidents
 Crow’s vision attracts both praise, criticism
 New American University plan ahead of schedule

Arizona State University
Arizona State University